Shapo may refer to:

 Denis Shapovalov (born 1999), nicknamed Shapo, Canadian tennis player
 Urial, or shapo, a species of Asian wild sheep 
 Shapo Reservoir, Hainan, China
 Shapo, a 2011 DSiWare game

See also
 Chapeau (disambiguation), pronounced the same in French